"Jus Lyke Compton" is the first single released off DJ Quik's second studio album, Way 2 Fonky. The song is produced by DJ Quik and Rob "Fonksta" Bacon.

Background and release
DJ Quik speaks about how so many cities seemed to be heavily influenced by the urban culture of Los Angeles. Some of the cities included Oakland, San Antonio, St. Louis, and Denver. However, the narrative of Denver is filled with contempt as Quik describes an incident that went down during a visit to the town.

Track listings
Vinyl, 12", Promo, 33 ⅓ RPM 
"Jus Lyke Compton" – 4:10
"Jus Lyke Compton (Radio Version)" – 4:10
"Jus Lyke Compton (Acapella)" – 1:11
"Niggaz Still Trippin'" (featuring AMG & Hi-C) – 4:12
"Jus Lyke Compton (Instrumental)" – 4:10

CD single
"Jus Lyke Compton (Radio Version)" – 4:10

Vinyl, 7", 45 RPM 
"Jus Lyke Compton" – 4:10
"Tonite" – 5:23

Chart performance

References

1992 singles
DJ Quik songs
Song recordings produced by DJ Quik
Gangsta rap songs
Songs written by DJ Quik
1992 songs